This is a list of public holidays in Guernsey.

Also, Alderney observes the first Monday of August as Summer Bank Holiday, and 15 December as Homecoming Day, commemorating the day in 1945 when evacuated residents returned to the island after the Second World War. Sark observes 10 May as its Liberation Day.

References

Guernsey
Guernsey